The Cisco Kid Returns is a 1945 American Western film. Released on April 3, 1945, it was the first of three Cisco Kid films made that year with Duncan Renaldo as Cisco and Martin Garralaga as Pancho. In this release, Cisco's real name is Juan Francisco Hernandez. Cisco must clear himself of murder charges, while preventing his girlfriend Rosita (Callejo) from eloping with his rival John Harris (Pryor).

The film was followed by the May 15 release of In Old New Mexico, which revealed Cisco's name to be Juan Carlos Francisco Antonio, and South of the Rio Grande on September 15 falling back to Cisco's name being Juan Francisco Hernandez. Martin Garralaga appears in both as Pancho.

Cast
Duncan Renaldo – The Cisco Kid/Juan Francisco Hernandez
Martin Garralaga – Pancho
Cecilia Callejo – Rosita Gonzales
Roger Pryor – John Harris

References

External links
 
 
 
 

1945 films
1945 Western (genre) films
American black-and-white films
Cisco Kid
Monogram Pictures films
Films scored by Albert Glasser
American Western (genre) films
1945 drama films
Films directed by John P. McCarthy
1940s English-language films
1940s American films